Kirksville is an unincorporated community located in Madison County, Kentucky, United States. It was formerly known as Centerville; the new name honored local store owner Samuel Kirkendall. It is located at the junction of Kentucky Route 595 and Kentucky Route 1295.

References

Unincorporated communities in Madison County, Kentucky
Unincorporated communities in Kentucky